Leptoderma retropinna is a species of slickheads found in the Indian Ocean.  

References

Alepocephalidae
Taxa named by Henry Weed Fowler
Fish described in 1943